"Victor, Victrola" is the seventh episode of the television series Gossip Girl. The episode was written by K.J. Steinberg and directed by Tony Wharmby. It originally aired on November 7, 2007, on The CW.

Plot 
A preview of Chuck at a burlesque club, mesmerized by an unidentified girl on stage, is rewound to start the episode with events that occurred two days earlier.

Chuck tells Blair of his proposal to his father to buy a burlesque club. Subsequently, he invites her to a victory party the following night to celebrate the opening of his potential business venture.

Meanwhile, Anne, Nate's mother, wants Nate to go to a rehabilitation centre for cocaine that really belonged to his father, The Captain. Once Anne leaves the room, The Captain promises Nate that he only used cocaine once.

At the loft, Jenny is busy trying to find a bracelet that Blair had loaned to her while she overhears Rufus speaking to her mother on the phone.

Serena and Dan's relationship escalates at school as Serena implies that she would like to take their relationship to the next level. Nate asks Jenny for her secrecy regarding the events at the masquerade ball, which is intercepted by Blair, who reveals that she found the bracelet at the ball.

Chuck walks into Bart and Lily kissing at Bart's office. Bart asks Chuck to not tell Serena or Eric about their relationship, which he is taking seriously. Chuck then tells Bart about a new business venture, pleasing Bart.

Dan begins to worry about his lack of sexual experience in comparison to Serena, reading books, watching videos and daydreaming about sex. Dan overhears Rufus on the phone speaking to his mother, who is having an affair with her neighbour.

Bart is unimpressed with Chuck's proposal to buy a burlesque club, who believes it is only an excuse for him to be around booze and women. Chuck then spots Bart with a younger woman in his limo. Blair's mother tells Blair that Nate had spoken to his mother about proposing to Blair in the future, while Nate witnesses The Captain buying more cocaine.

At the loft, Serena and Dan have the place to themselves, escalating quickly until Vanessa shows up uninvited. Chuck is drunk as a result of his father's rejection and reveals to Lily that he spotted Bart earlier with a younger woman. Nate confesses to his mother that the cocaine really belong to The Captain and asks her to help him, but she refuses to acknowledge his addiction.

As Blair tells Jenny about her excitement over receiving Nate's family ring, Jenny reveals to Blair that Nate really loves Serena. This causes obvious tension as Nate and Blair's families have a get-together. Nate and The Captain step out to smoke cigars, which Nate uses the opportunity to confront his dad on seeking help. The Captain gets angry and punches Nate in front of a nearby police car, who arrests The Captain for drug possession. Blair, who witnessed the scene from the window, confronts Nate about his feelings for Serena. She subsequently ends their relationship and heads to Victrola, the burlesque club.

Blair, still riled from her break-up with Nate, accepts Chuck's dare for her to go on stage to participate in the burlesque performance.

Meanwhile, Lily shows up at Rufus' art gallery unexpectedly. Dan and Serena, finally getting an opportunity alone, decide to wait before they have sex. Jenny visits her mother and asks her to come home.

After the party at Victrola, Chuck gives Blair a ride home in his limo. Blair kisses Chuck. "You sure?" Chuck asks, which Blair confirms with another kiss.

Reception 
Vogue included the episode on its list of the 20 best episodes in the series.

References 

2007 American television episodes
Gossip Girl (season 1) episodes